The Cincinnati Health Department (CHD) is a municipal agency for the City of Cincinnati, Ohio, that runs health centers, lab services, communicable disease experts, environmental services and other public health programs. The CHD has more than 300 physicians, nurses, dentists and dental workers, laboratory technicians, pharmacists, dietitians, lead experts, sanitarians, litter control experts, pest control operators and licensed risk assessors. The department is led by a city health commissioner. In 2018, Melba Moore was hired as the city's 42nd health commissioner.

Health department encounters
In 2009, CHD saw more than 35,000 patients. With inspections throughout the city, including food service, swimming pool, nuisance complaints, waste facility, CHD reached almost every Cincinnatian in some way.

Clinical services
 153,548 medical visits 
 2,926 dental sealants 
 62,740 pharmacy visits 
 43,560 lab specimens provided

Nursing services
 31,949 health encounters 
 7,667 in-home visits to children and adults in need of care

Environmental services
 5,085 food service inspections 
 492 swimming pools inspected 
 3,360 nuisance complaints investigated 
 1,055 waste facility inspections

Preparedness
 More than 45,000 H1N1 flu immunizations at schools, health centers and community sessions in Cincinnati.

See also
Hamilton County Public Health

References

External links

Cincinnati Community Health Improvement Plan (2020-2022)

Government of Cincinnati
Health departments in the United States
Medical and health organizations based in Ohio